The Burmese trout (Raiamas guttatus) is a species of ray-finned fish in the genus Raiamas.

They are found in the Irrawaddy, Mekong, Chao Phraya, Salween River basins and also in the northern Malay Peninsula.

References 

Burmese trout
Freshwater fish of Southeast Asia
Fish of Myanmar
Burmese trout